La Grande/Union County Airport  is four miles southeast of La Grande, in Union County, Oregon, United States. It is owned by Union County.

West Coast Airlines DC-3s stopped at the airport from 1959 to 1960.

Facilities

In the year ending July 27, 2006 the airport had 16,000 aircraft operations, average 43 per day: 81% general aviation, 16% air taxi and 3% military.

Cargo carriers

References

External links 
Union County Airport at Union County website

Airports in Union County, Oregon
La Grande, Oregon